PAL-V (Personal Air and Land Vehicle) is a Dutch company that is involved in the development of a commercial flying car, the PAL-V Liberty. It is a compact two-person aircraft that can travel on public roads.

References

External links
 

Aerospace companies of the Netherlands
Companies established in 2001